Derek Matlock is an American college baseball coach and former pitcher. Matlock is the head coach of the Texas–Rio Grande Valley Vaqueros baseball team.

Coaching career
Matlock began his coaching career as an assistant coach at Eastern Hills High School in Fort Worth, Texas. In 1996, Matlock became the head coach of Eastern Hills where he won multiple district championships and Coach-of-the-Year honors. In 1999, Matlock left Eastern Hills to start the Flower Mound High School program from scratch. On July 15, 2004, Matlock joined the TCU Horned Frogs baseball program as a volunteer assistant coach.

After two seasons at TCU, Matlock joined the Texas State program as the team's recruiting coordinator and pitching coach. While at Texas State, Matlock helped develop Paul Goldschmidt into an eighth-round draft pick.

On June 12, 2012, Matlock joined the West Virginia Mountaineers baseball staff as the team's recruiting coordinator and pitching coach.

On June 10, 2017, Matlock was introduced as the head coach of the Texas–Rio Grande Valley Vaqueros baseball team.

Head coaching record

See also
 List of current NCAA Division I baseball coaches

References

External links
TCU Horned Frogs bio
Texas State Bobcats bio
Texas–Rio Grande Valley Vaqueros bio

Living people
1967 births
Baseball pitchers
UT Arlington Mavericks baseball players
High school baseball coaches in the United States
TCU Horned Frogs baseball coaches
Texas State Bobcats baseball coaches
West Virginia Mountaineers baseball coaches
UT Rio Grande Valley Vaqueros baseball coaches
Texas Wesleyan University alumni